Benoît Maurice (born September 16, 1971 in Toulon, France) is a retired professional footballer. He played as a central defender.

External links
Benoit Maurice profile at chamoisfc79.fr

1971 births
Living people
French footballers
Association football defenders
Stade Lavallois players
Amiens SC players
Clermont Foot players
Chamois Niortais F.C. players
Ligue 2 players